Ernest Wichner (born in Zăbrani, 17 April 1952) is a German writer, editor, and literary translator of Banat Swabian origin.

Translations
 Norman Manea: Der Trenchcoat. Erzählung. Steidl Verlag, Göttingen 1990
 Max Blecher: Aus der unmittelbaren Unwirklichkeit. Prosa, übersetzt und mit einem Nachwort versehen von Ernest Wichner, Edition Plasma, Berlin 1990 (Neuausgabe mit Nachwort von Herta Müller, Bibliothek Suhrkamp, Frankfurt a.M. 2003)
 Carmen-Francesca Banciu: Fenster in Flammen. Erzählungen, übersetzt von Ernest Wichner und Rolf Bossert, Rotbuch Verlag, Berlin 1992
 Ștefan Bănulescu: Ein Schneesturm aus anderer Zeit. Erzählungen, übersetzt von Ernest Wichner und Oskar Pastior, Nachwort von Ernest Wichner, Suhrkamp Verlag, Frankfurt a.M. 1994
 Dumitru Țepeneag: Hotel Europa. Roman, Alexander Fest Verlag, Berlin 1998 (Taschenbuch Suhrkamp, Verlag Frankfurt a.M. 2000)
 Daniel Bănulescu: Schrumpeln wirst du wirst eine exotische Frucht sein. Gedichte (rum./dt.), aus dem Rumänischen und mit einem Nachwort von Ernest Wichner, edition per procura, Wien/Lana 2003
 Nora Iuga: Der Autobus mit den Buckligen. Gedichte, aus dem Rumänischen von Ernest Wichner, Edition Solitude, Stuttgart 2003
 M. Blecher: Vernarbte Herzen. Roman, übersetzt und mit einem Nachwort von Ernest Wichner, Bibliothek Suhrkamp, Frankfurt a.M., 2006
 Cristian Popescu: Familie Popescu, Prosa (rum./dt.), aus dem Rumänischen von Ernest Wichner, edition per procura, Wien/Lana 2006
 Nora Iuga: Gefährliche Launen. Ausgewählte Gedichte, aus dem Rumänischen von Ernest Wichner, mit einem Nachwort von Mircea Cǎrtǎrescu, Verlag Klett-Cotta, Stuttgart 2007
 M. Blecher: Beleuchtete Höhle. Sanatoriumstagebuch, übersetzt und mit einem Nachwort von Ernest Wichner, Bibliothek Suhrkamp, Frankfurt a.M. 2008
 Ion Mureșan: Acces interzis!/Zugang verboten! Gedichte (rum./dt.), ausgewählt, mit einem Nachwort und übersetzt von Ernest Wichner, büroabrasch, Wien 2008
 Mircea Cărtărescu: Warum wir die Frauen lieben. Geschichten, aus dem Rumänischen von Ernest Wichner, Suhrkamp, Frankfurt a.M. 2008
 Daniel Bănulescu: Was schön ist und dem Daniel gefällt. Gedichte, übersetzt und mit einem Nachwort versehen von Ernest Wichner; merz&solitude, Stuttgart 2009
 Christopher Middleton: Im geheimen Haus. Gedichte englisch-deutsch, übersetzt von Ernest Wichner, Verlag Das Wunderhorn, Heidelberg 2009
 Mircea Cărtărescu: Travestie, Suhrkamp Verlag, Berlin 2010

Awards
 1987 Förderpreis zum Marburger Literaturpreis
 1990 Stipendium Künstlerhaus Edenkoben
 1991 Förderpreis zum Andreas-Gryphius-Preis
 1997 Lyrik-Stipendium Niedersachsen
 2005 Preis der Stadt Münster für Europäische Poesie (with Daniel Banulescu)
 2020 Johann Heinrich Voß Prize in Translation

References

External links
 
 Ernest Wichner bei literaturhaeuser.net
40 Jahre Aktionsgruppe Banat, in: Halbjahresschrift - hjs-online, 2. April 2012

1952 births
People from Arad County
German editors
German translators
Translators from Romanian
Translators to German
Living people
German male non-fiction writers